Betty: A Glad Awakening is a memoir by Betty Ford with Chris Chase. The Book was published by Doubleday in 1987. The book chronicles her struggle with addiction to alcohol and several drugs.

References

1987 non-fiction books
American memoirs
Memoirs about alcoholism
Memoirs about drugs
Doubleday (publisher) books
Betty Ford